The Actor is an upcoming American film directed by Duke Johnson, from a screenplay by Johnson and Stephen Cooney, based on the 2010 novel Memory by Donald E. Westlake. The film marks Johnson's solo directorial debut and stars André Holland as Paul Cole, a New York actor who lost his memory after being beaten up and left for dead in 1950s Ohio. Stranded in a mysterious small town, Paul struggles to get back home and reclaim the life and identity he's lost. The ensemble cast includes Gemma Chan, May Calamawy, Toby Jones,  Tracey Ullman, Olwen Fouéré, Joe Cole, Tanya Reynolds, Asim Chaudhry, Youssef Kerkour, Simon McBurney and Edward Hogg.

Cast
 André Holland as Paul Cole
 Gemma Chan
 May Calamawy
 Olwen Fouéré as Old Lady Track
 Toby Jones
 Simon McBurney
 Joe Cole as Nick
 Tracey Ullman
 Tanya Reynolds
 Asim Chaudhry
 Youssef Kerkour as Black Jack/Ed/Defense Attorney/Busdriver
 Edward Hogg as Make Up Artist
 Thomas Dominique as Phil

Production

Development
On February 24, 2021, Deadline reported that Ryan Gosling had committed to star in The Actor, with Duke Johnson directing a screenplay he wrote with Stephen Cooney, based on Donald E. Westlake's 2010 novel Memory. Gosling was set to produce the film with Waypoint Entertainment's Ken Kao, Johnson and Abigail Spencer's Innerlight Films, and Paul Young's Make Good  company, with CAA Media Finance and Endeavor Content co-repping the film's U.S. rights, and Endeavor Content handling international sales. Collider reported that before Gosling signed on to star in the film, Aaron Taylor-Johnson was previously circling the project. The Actor was a top seller at Berlin's 2021 European Film Market.

On April 12, 2021, it was reported that Neon had acquired North American distribution rights to the film and that Charlie Kaufman–who co-directed the 2015 film Anomalisa with Johnson–had joined the project as executive producer. The same day, Neon shared on their Twitter account that the film would be released in 2022.

On October 18, 2022, producer Abigail Spencer said in an interview with the website The Retaility that the film was in pre-production in Budapest and that André Holland and Gemma Chan were the leads. On October 29, 2022, FilmBook announced that actress Olwen Fouéré had joined the cast, which also included  Tracey Ullman, May Calamawy, Tanya Reynolds, Simon McBurney, Edward Hogg, Asim Chaudhry, and Youssef Kerkour.

Filming
Principal photography was originally scheduled to start in Los Angeles on September 6, 2021, but was pushed back to mid-January 2022.

Filming took place in Budapest, Hungary in November 2022.

References

External links 
 

Upcoming films
Upcoming English-language films
2020s American films
Films about actors
Films about amnesia
Films shot in Budapest
Films based on American novels
Neon (distributor) films
Films directed by Duke Johnson
Films based on works by Donald E. Westlake